The Clarence Castors are a Canadian Junior ice hockey team from Clarence, Ontario, Canada.  They are part of the National Capital Junior Hockey League.

The Castors operated from 1987-2017 as the Rockland Nationals in Rockland, Ontario.

History
The original Nationals were founded in 1973 to replace the Hull Festivals who had just left the Central Junior A Hockey League for the Quebec Major Junior Hockey League.  In just three season the Nationals, coached by Bryan Murray, won the league, the Dudley Hewitt Cup as Central Canadian champions, and the Centennial Cup 1976 National Championship.  Unfortunately for them, in those days the teams played sets of best-of-seven series to determine the national champion. Many successful Tier II clubs like the Red Deer Rustlers, the Guelph Platers, and the Vernon Vipers franchises were well rooted in their communities when they were victorious, with warchests of cash from major sponsors and massive fan support awaiting long playoff runs.  The Nationals were in their infantile stage as an organization and found themselves not only national champions but financially bankrupt from months of travel across the county.  They survived one more season on life support funds from the CJHL before packing it in for the 1977-78 season.  The fall of the Nationals convinced the CJHL to petition the Canadian Amateur Hockey Association to consider alternate, cheaper, playdown methods to determine regional and national champions.  The CAHA answered back a few seasons later with the formation of round-robin championship tournaments.  Until the Pembroke Lumber Kings won the 2011 Royal Bank Cup, the Nationals were the only team in Central League history to win a national championship.

A decade later the Nationals were reborn.  In 1987, the Nationals entered the Eastern Ontario Junior C Hockey League and won the league title in their first season back in action.  In recent years, the Nationals have been pushing to re-enter the CJHL, but with no results so far.

Centennial Cup 1976 and on
In only their third season, the Nationals were league champions.  They moved on to take on the Southern Ontario Junior A Hockey League and Ontario Hockey Association champion Guelph Platers.  The series went the distance, but the Nationals pulled out a 4-games-to-3 series win.

The Nationals then took on the Lac-Megantic Royals, the champions of the Quebec Provincial Junior A Hockey League.  The Nationals defeated them 4-games-to-1 to get to the Eastern Canadian Championship.

In the Eastern Canadian championship, the Nationals drew the Island Junior Hockey League's Charlottetown Colonels.  The Nationals overpowered the Islanders and crushed them 4-games-to-none.  In the final, the Nationals came to play the Alberta Junior Hockey League, Doyle Cup, and Abbott Cup Champion Spruce Grove Mets. The Mets were floored by the Nationals in the first two games, losing 9-4 and 7-1 respectively.  In Game 3, the Mets pulled close in a 5-3 loss and then took game four 4-3. Game 5 saw the National regain their early series form and crush the Mets 7-3 to win their first and only National title 4-games-to-1.

Their landmark victory, led by coach Bryan Murray, was the first time a team from the Central Junior A Hockey League had won the Junior A National Championship.  The cost of the venture left the team in financial turmoil and led to them folding a year later.

The Rockland Nationals returned in 1987, ten years after folding. Before the start of 2017-2018 season, the Rockland Nationals were renamed to Les Castors de Clarence (or Clarence Castors) and have move to the Clarence Creek Arena in Clarence-Rockland, Ontario.

Season-by-season record
Note: GP = Games Played, W = Wins, L = Losses, T = Ties, OTL = Overtime Losses, GF = Goals for, GA = Goals against

External links
Castors Homepage
Revisiting the 1975-76 Rockland Nationals

Eastern Ontario Junior C Hockey League teams
Central Canada Hockey League teams
Ice hockey clubs established in 1987
Clarence-Rockland
1987 establishments in Ontario